The gymnastics competition in the 2003 Summer Universiade were held in Daegu, South Korea.

Medal overview

Artistic gymnastics

Men's events

Women's events

Rhythmic gymnastics

Medal table

References
 Universiade gymnastics medalists on HickokSports
 Universiade rhythmic gymnastics medalists on HickokSports
 Detailed results of individual all-around and event finals

Universiade
2003 Summer Universiade
2003